Song of Summer is a 1968 black-and-white television film co-written, produced, and directed by Ken Russell for the BBC's Omnibus series which was first broadcast on 15 September 1968. It portrays the final six years of Frederick Delius' life, during which Eric Fenby lived with the composer and his wife Jelka as Delius's amanuensis. The title is borrowed from the Delius tone poem A Song of Summer, which is heard along with other Delius works on the film's soundtrack.

It stars Max Adrian as Delius, Christopher Gable as Fenby, and Maureen Pryor as Jelka, with director Russell in a cameo role as a philandering priest. The cinematography was by Dick Bush, and the editing was by Roger Crittenden. It was shot on black-and-white 35mm film.

It has received wide praise since its first screening, and Ken Russell himself said it was the best film he ever made and he would not have done a single shot differently.

Book
Song of Summer was based on Eric Fenby's memoir Delius As I Knew Him (1936, republished in 1966), which recounts his offer to  transcribe Frederick Delius's music from the composer's dictation. At the time, 66-year-old Delius lived with his wife Jelka and their servants in Grez-sur-Loing, roughly 70 kilometres south of Paris. Delius had never even heard of Fenby, a struggling 22-year-old composer and theatre organist living with his parents in Scarborough, North Yorkshire. Nonetheless, he accepted Fenby's unsolicited offer. Fenby stayed with the Deliuses on and off for six years, until Delius's death in 1934. He had immense difficulty dealing with the cantankerous, irascible and impatient composer, although Delius' conduct might have been the product of his constant pain. Neither party had ever worked this way before, but Fenby was immediately expected to keep up with Delius's fast pace when dictating, and to make sense of his out-of-tune singing. He was also required to read for long stretches to Delius, the composer's favourite books being Mark Twain's Adventures of Huckleberry Finn and Tom Sawyer. Fenby was a devout Catholic and Delius hated Christianity, even going so far as to say that Fenby should not go to the local chapel but visit one further away. On his first visit home, Fenby had a nervous breakdown and lost the use of his own legs for two weeks. Later, Jelka needed to go for treatment for stomach cancer, and Fenby virtually became Delius's nurse for a month. Delius died only two days after Jelka returned.

Eric Fenby coached actors Max Adrian (Delius) and Christopher Gable (Fenby) in their roles and regarded their portrayals as "absolutely true to character" and the film as "disturbingly lifelike". However, he did not attend the actual filming, in order not to distract the director, and also on request from Christopher Gable, who was making his first film (he had previously been a dancer with the Royal Ballet). Max Adrian was a favourite actor of Ken Russell. Adrian told Fenby that he had more difficulty in ridding himself of involvement in the role of Delius than he had ever experienced with other roles.

Reception
The film has often been described as the best of the biographical films Ken Russell made for the BBC in the 1960s. (He had previously made films about Bartók, Elgar and Debussy, and would later make films about Richard Strauss, Tchaikovsky, Liszt and others.) Words like "subtle", "sensitive", "exquisite", "moving", "beautiful", "poignant", "magical", "exceptional" and "tour de force" recur in critiques of Song of Summer. The acting by the principals was universally praised. When he saw the finished film, Eric Fenby was traumatised, for it brought to the surface feelings he had been suppressing for decades, and he suffered a severe nervous breakdown which took him a full year to recover from.

In 2001, a slightly shortened version was released on DVD, as Delius: Song of Summer.

Kate Bush's song "Delius (Song of Summer)", the B-side of her 1980 "Army Dreamers", is an appreciation of the composer as portrayed in Russell's film.

Music
Song of Summer uses the music of Delius throughout, except for a passage where Percy Grainger calls at Grez, and Country Gardens and Handel in the Strand are heard, and another in which Delius has a record of Jerome Kern's "Ol' Man River" played. The original film starts with an excerpt from a Laurel and Hardy film, and then shows Fenby improvising music on an organ for the theatre patrons. In the DVD release, copyright permission for the Laurel and Hardy film could not be obtained, so the introduction was cut from the release; however, the music credits still include Eric Fenby.

Details
A theme that is quite overtly explored is the dichotomy between a composer who is an egotistical and tyrannical monster and womaniser (his blindness and paralysis were the result of tertiary syphilis contracted at Paris brothels and with other women), but who writes ravishingly beautiful, lyrical, sensitive music. Fenby himself comments "I can't reconcile such hardness with such lovely music".

Russell explored the possibility of making the film at the Delius home at Grez, but that proved impractical. Budgetary considerations meant it could not be made in France at all, so it was filmed mainly in Surrey, with extra scenes in Scarborough and the Lake District.

The gramophone used in the film was Delius's own, and Jelka's scattering of rose petals over Frederick's dead body from her wheelchair was exactly what she did in real life.

One scene shows Fenby attending a church and discovering the parish priest (played by Ken Russell himself) making love to a girl in a pew. This episode apparently occurred, but it was not mentioned in Delius As I Knew Him. Fenby told it to Russell for his ears alone and was shocked when he saw it in the film.

Inaccuracies
 The Laurel and Hardy film shown was Way Out West (1937), which was a sound film, was made after the events of 'Song of Summer", and would not have required additional music from a theatre organ.
 Although he had various paintings by Edvard Munch, Delius did not own any version of The Scream, which is shown on the wall of Fenby's room.
 Jelka puts on a recording of The Walk to the Paradise Garden from his opera A Village Romeo and Juliet, accidentally starting on side 2. When Delius rudely corrects her, she apologises and puts on side 1, but what we hear is music that actually starts six bars later than the music she put on first.
 Eric Fenby is shown playing chess with his father, who is wearing an open-neck shirt. In fact, Fenby's father could not play chess and Eric never saw him without a collar and tie.
 The chessboard is oriented incorrectly. In chess, the top left square, or a8, is always white, whereas it is shown as black.

Principals
 Director and writer: Ken Russell
 Frederick Delius: Max Adrian
 Eric Fenby: Christopher Gable
 Jelka Delius: Maureen Pryor
 Percy Grainger: David Collings
 Minor roles are played by:
Roger Worrod (Bruder, the German servant, who reads Nietzsche and Edgar Wallace to Delius, feeds him, and carries him from room to room)
Geraldine Sherman (girl next door)
Elizabeth Ercy (maid)
Norman James (doctor)
Ken Russell (priest, uncredited)

References

External links
 
 

1968 television films
1968 films
BBC television dramas
British black-and-white films
British docudrama films
Films about classical music and musicians
Films about composers
Films directed by Ken Russell
1960s English-language films
1960s British films